Bellingham is an area of South East London, England, within the London Borough of Lewisham. It lies south of Catford and north-west of Beckenham, and is part of the Catford postal district (SE6).

History

According to author and historian Nick Barratt, there was certainly a Saxon community at Bellingham. In 10th century Anglo-Saxon charters, the place is referred to as Beringaham and by 1198 the name had changed from starting with 'Ber' to 'Bel' through Norman influence. Some streets in Bellingham are named after the Saxon king Alfred the Great and his extended family: King Alfred Avenue, Elfrida Crescent and Arnulf Street.

The area was farmland for centuries, but the London County Council developed a cottage estate from 1919 to 1923 on the former Bellingham Farm, and was completed before World War II. The estate is bordered to the east and west by railway lines running south from Catford. Along the south it is bordered by Southend Lane, the A2218 main road. The River Ravensbourne runs through Bellingham, although it is either underground or part of a man-made section of the river. The Prime Meridian passes to the east of Bellingham.

Amenities
Randlesdown Road serves as a mini 'High Street' for Bellingham providing a local supermarket, men's and women's hair dressers, dry cleaner, off licence, news agent, fish and chip shop, The Fellowship pub and cinema, various takeaways and a gym (situated on Bellingham playing fields). It is known for being a very multicultural area.

Bellingham Green is a hexagonal public park at the centre of the estate.

Transport
Bellingham railway station serves the area with services to Kentish Town (London Blackfriars on Sundays) via Catford and to Sevenoaks via Swanley. Bellingham is served by many Transport for London buses connecting it with areas including Beckenham, Biggin Hill, Bromley, Catford, Central London, Greenwich, Shoreditch, Camberwell, Bermondsey, Deptford, Elephant & Castle, Brockley, Lewisham, New Cross, Orpington, Peckham and Woolwich.

Pre-school and primary education
Pre-schools, nurseries and kindergartens include Kindergarten Forest Hill in Bellingham Green and Umbrella House Day Nursery. Primary schools in Bellingham include Athelney Primary School, St Augustines and Elfrida Primary School.

Image gallery

References

Districts of the London Borough of Lewisham
Areas of London